Romania will compete at the 2009 World Championships in Athletics from 15 to 23 August. A team of 17 athletes was announced in preparation for the competition. Selected athletes have achieved one of the competition's qualifying standards.

Medalists

Points table

Team selection

Track and road events

Field and combined events

Results

Women
Track and road events

Field events

External links
Official competition website

Nations at the 2009 World Championships in Athletics
World Championships in Athletics
Romania at the World Championships in Athletics